Karim Ismoilov (formerly Eskiguzar) is a jamoat in Tajikistan. It is part of the city of Vahdat in Districts of Republican Subordination. The jamoat has a total population of 34,544 (2015).

References

Populated places in Districts of Republican Subordination
Jamoats of Tajikistan